Kaptai is an Upazila of Rangamati District in the Division of Chittagong, Bangladesh.
Name of the Kaptai was derived from a Tripuri word "Kaptetoima".It is said that in the past days the reverine was so wild and full in tropical flora and fauna. Huge amount of several verities of canes used to be found throughout the course of the river that flows that from the south, upper tridge and the river makes its estuary into the Kainsa Khyong (Karnafuli river).

Notable landmarks are the Karnaphuli Hydroelectric Power Station, the only Hydro-electric power plant of Bangladesh. The Kaptai Dam, built for this purpose on the Karnaphuli River, created the Kaptai Lake, the largest man-made dam in Bangladesh.

Geography
It has 12992 households and total area 259 km2.

Demographics
At the 2001 Bangladesh census, Kaptai had a population of 66,135. Males constituted 55.45% of the population, and females 44.55%. The population of those aged 18 and older was 32,352. The average literacy rate was 49.9% (7+ years).

Landmarks
 Kaptai lake
Karnaphuli Paper Mills 
Kaptai National Park is situated at Rangamati. It was established in 1999 and its area is 5,464.78 hectares(13,498.0 Acres).
Waggachara Tea Estate is situated on the bank of the Karnaphuli river.

Administration
Kaptai Upazila is divided into five union parishads: Chandraghona, Chitmorom, Kaptai, Raikhali, and Waggya. The union parishads are subdivided into 10 mauzas and 144 villages.

See also
 Upazilas of Bangladesh
 Districts of Bangladesh
 Divisions of Bangladesh

References

External links
 
 

Upazilas of Rangamati Hill District
Karnaphuli River